Yashomati Thakur is a politician from the Indian National Congress. She was the Guardian minister of Amravati District Government of Maharashtra 2020-2022 and member of the 14th Maharashtra Legislative Assembly, where she represents the Teosa Assembly Constituency.

Yashomati Thakur was appointed AICC Secretary for the congress party affairs in the Karnataka state. She was appointed AICC secretary for Amravati, Maharashtra.

Yashomati Thakur won for the third consecutive time from the Teosa assembly; before her, her father represented same constituency multiple times.

She was sworn in as Cabinet Minister in Uddhav Thackeray led Mahavikas Aghadi Government. She was also the guardian minister of Amravati district.

Criminal Case(s) 

2012 Assault Case

A sessions court in Amravati on October 15 convicted Ms Thakur, who is the state's women and child development minister, and three others including her driver, in the case and sentenced them to three months imprisonment.

Vidhansabha Talika President 2019 
She was appointed Vidhansabha Talika President on 16 December 2019 by Nana Patole for winter session of Maharashtra Assembly held in Nagpur Vidarbha.

References

External links
Yashomati Thakur's official website

Maharashtra MLAs 2014–2019
People from Amravati district
Marathi politicians
Living people
Indian National Congress politicians from Maharashtra
21st-century Indian women politicians
21st-century Indian politicians
1974 births
Women members of the Maharashtra Legislative Assembly